Four referendums were held in Switzerland during 1939. The first two were held on 22 January on a popular initiative on civil rights (which was rejected) and a federal resolution on the restricted use of the urgency clause in the constitution (which was approved). The third was held on 4 June on a constitutional amendment regarding the funding for government policies on defence and unemployment, and was approved by voters. The fourth was held on 3 December on a federal law on the employment status and insurance for federal civil servants, and was rejected by voters.

Background
The referendums on the urgency clause and the funding of defence and unemployment policies both involved amending the constitution, and so were "obligatory" referendums, requiring a double majority; a majority of the popular vote and majority of the cantons. The decision of each canton was based on the vote in that canton. Full cantons counted as one vote, whilst half cantons counted as half. The popular initiative on civil rights also required a double majority, whilst the referendum on civil servants was an optional referendum, requiring only a majority of voters in favour to pass.

Results

January: popular initiative on civil rights

January: Use of the urgency clause

June: Funding for defence and unemployment policy

December: Civil servants

References

1939 referendums
1939 in Switzerland
Referendums in Switzerland